Revo Powertrains is an electric vehicle powertrain company based in Alameda, California. Created by Tesla co-founder Ian Wright.

Located in Alameda County, California by Wrightspeed, Inc. (a Delaware corporation).

Products
The Wrightspeed Route is a plug and play repower kit for commercial trucks. It is a high-power medium-duty vehicle powertrain that uses electric drive with an onboard power station for efficiency and range and is a series hybrid retrofit kit for trucks. The kit includes controls, 200 kW inverter, electric motors, gear box with clutch-less shifting, battery pack, battery management system, and LCD user interface.

Founder Ian Wright discusses motivations for building truck powertrains in a 
TedX Talk and Unfiltered interview.

Clients
 FedEx
 NZ Bus

See also 
 Battery electric vehicle
 Electric truck
 Fleet operator
 Garbage truck
 Isuzu NPR
 Tesla Motors
 Vehicle manufacturer
 Wrightspeed X1, a one-off Ariel Atom heavily modified to use an all-electric powertrain, made by Wrightspeed.

References

External links 
  formerly wrightspeed.com
 From Wrightspeed, the jet-powered delivery truck, BBC.

Electric vehicle industry
Manufacturing companies based in California
Manufacturing companies established in 2003
American companies established in 2003
New Zealand companies established in 2003